Elachista christenseni is a moth of the family Elachistidae. It is found in Greece.

References

christenseni
Moths described in 2000
Moths of Europe